Diallomus is a genus of Asian wandering spiders first described by Eugène Simon in 1897.  it contains only two species, both found in Sri Lanka. Originally placed with the Zoridae (now included in Miturgidae), it was moved to Ctenidae in 2003.

References

Araneomorphae genera
Arthropods of Sri Lanka
Ctenidae
Spiders of Asia
Taxa named by Eugène Simon